The Health and Safety (Offences) Act 2008 (c 20) is an Act of the Parliament of the United Kingdom. Its purpose was to change the "mode of trial" (i.e. whether summarily or on indictment) and maximum penalty available for certain offences against health and safety legislation. It was passed on 16 October 2008.

Background
In England and Wales, health and safety offences fall under the Health and Safety at Work etc. Act 1974 and the Health and Safety (Offences) Act 2008.

According to the explanatory notes to the 2008 Act, its precursors were:
A joint review of the maximum penalties for health and safety offences carried out between February and September 1999 by the Home Office, the Department of the Environment, Transport and the Regions, and the Health and Safety Executive;
The 2005 report Reducing administrative burdens: effective inspection and enforcement by Philip Hampton;
The 2006 report Regulating Justice: Making Sanctions Effective by Richard B Macrory.

Section 1 - Health and safety offences: mode of trial and maximum penalty

Section 1(1) substituted new sections 33(2) and (3) for the existing sections 33(1A) to (4) of the Health and Safety at Work etc. Act 1974.

Section 1(2), with Schedule 1, inserted Schedule 3A of that Act.

Section 1(3) substituted new paragraphs 31(2) and (3) for the existing paragraphs 31(1A) to (5) of the Health and Safety at Work (Northern Ireland) Order 1978 (S.I. 1978/1039 (N.I. 9))

Section 1(4), with Schedule 2, inserted Schedule 3A of that Order.

Section 2 - Consequential amendments and repeals
Section 2(1) provides that Schedules 3 and 4 have effect.

Section 3 - Short title, commencement and extent
Section 3(2) provides that the Act came into force at the end of the period of three months that began on the date on which it was passed. The word "months" means calendar months. The day (that is to say, 16 October 2008) on which the Act was passed (that is to say, received royal assent) is included in the period of three months. This means that the Act came into force on 16 January 2009.

Section 3(3) provides that the Act does not apply to offences committed before 16 January 2009.

Subsequent legislation
New legislation came into force on 12 March 2015 (section 85 of the Legal Aid, Sentencing and Punishment of Offenders Act 2012) granting magistrates powers to issue unlimited fines for health and safety offences, and so the maximum penalties no longer apply.

According to solicitor Victoria Glover, the reasons for the removal of the cap included a perception that fines could act as a greater deterrent to offenders, and until the change in the law, magistrates had been limited in the sentencing they could impose, the change would allow fines to be more proportionate to the impact of the offence, and while previously magistrates would commit a matter to the Crown Court where it was felt that their sentencing powers were inadequate, they would now be able to adequately sentence the offender. This would, in theory, free up the Crown Court to deal with serious offenders and reduce delay and costs previously incurred as a result of the committal, and also meant that the court which had heard all of the evidence and facts of the case could make a just decision in relation to sentencing.

References

External links
The Health and Safety (Offences) Act 2008, as amended from the National Archives.
The Health and Safety (Offences) Act 2008, as originally enacted from the National Archives.
Explanatory notes to the Health and Safety (Offences) Act 2008.

United Kingdom Acts of Parliament 2008